The following is a list of radio stations in the Canadian province of New Brunswick, .

External links
Canadian Communications Foundation - History of radio stations in New Brunswick

New Brunswick
Radio stations